The 2013 Major League Soccer season was the 101st season of FIFA-sanctioned soccer in the United States and Canada, the 35th with a national first-division league, and the 18th season of Major League Soccer. The season featured 19 total clubs (16 from the United States, 3 from Canada).

The regular season began on March 2, when Sporting Kansas City defeated the Philadelphia Union 3–1 at PPL Park. The 2013 Major League Soccer All-Star Game was held on July 31, 2013 in Sporting Park in Kansas City, Kansas (hosted by Sporting Kansas City). The regular season ended on October 27. The New York Red Bulls won the Supporters' Shield and Sporting Kansas City went on to win the MLS Cup in a penalty kick shootout against Real Salt Lake.

Teams, stadiums, and personnel

Stadiums and locations

†Actual capacity is higher; seats rationed for soccer games

Personnel and sponsorship
 On January 15, 2013, Sporting Kansas City and Livestrong officially cut ties following the announcement of Lance Armstrong using PEDs, and Livestrong Sporting Park was renamed to just simply Sporting Park.
 On January 17, 2013, Sporting Kansas City officially announced their first-ever jersey sponsor, Ivy Funds.
 On March 4, 2013, it was announced that The Home Depot Center, home of Chivas USA and the Los Angeles Galaxy, was to be renamed StubHub Center, after the online ticket marketplace StubHub effective June 1.
 On September 10, 2013, FC Dallas has reached a long-term agreement with Toyota to rename FC Dallas Stadium to Toyota Stadium.

Note: All teams use Adidas as kit manufacturer.

Player transfers

Major League Soccer employs 12 methods to acquire players. These include: signing players on transfers/free transfers as is done in most of the world; via trades; drafting players through mechanisms such as the MLS SuperDraft, MLS Supplemental Draft, or MLS Re-Entry Draft; rarely used methods which cover extreme hardship and injury replacement; signing players as Designated Players or Homegrown Players; placing a discovery claim on players; waivers; and methods peculiar to MLS such as through allocation or a weighted lottery.

Allocation ranking
The allocation ranking is the mechanism used to determine which MLS club has first priority to acquire a U.S. National Team player who signs with MLS after playing abroad, or a former MLS player who returns to the League after having gone to a club abroad for a transfer fee. The allocation rankings may also be used in the event two or more clubs file a request for the same player on the same day. The allocations will be ranked in reverse order of finish for the 2012 season, taking playoff performance into account.

Once the club uses its allocation ranking to acquire a player, it drops to the bottom of the list. A ranking can be traded, provided that part of the compensation received in return is another club's ranking. At all times, each club is assigned one ranking. The rankings reset at the end of each MLS League season.

On December 12, 2012, Portland Timbers acquired the number 2 ranking from Chivas USA in exchange for the number 3 ranking and an international roster spot.

On February 19, 2013, Chivas USA traded the No. 3 ranking to Seattle Sounders FC in the Shalrie Joseph trade. It was also reported that Seattle sent the No. 15 allocation ranking to Chivas USA as part of the deal, although Seattle appeared to have owned the No. 16 selection and not the No. 15 selection.

On July 1, 2013, Chivas USA acquired the number 1 allocation ranking from Toronto FC in exchange for the #16 ranking, a first-round pick in the 2015 MLS SuperDraft, and an international roster spot.

Weighted lottery
Some players are assigned to MLS teams via a weighted lottery process. A team can only acquire one player per year through a weighted lottery. The players made available through lotteries include: (i) Generation adidas players signed after the MLS SuperDraft; and (ii) Draft eligible players to whom an MLS contract was offered but who failed to sign with the League prior to the SuperDraft.

The team with the worst record over its last 30 regular season games (dating back to previous season if necessary and taking playoff performance into account) will have the greatest probability of winning the lottery. Teams are not required to participate in a lottery. Players are assigned via the lottery system in order to prevent a player from potentially influencing his destination club with a strategic holdout.

Below are the results of 2013 weighted lotteries:

Ownership changes

Managerial changes

Standings

Conference tables

Eastern Conference

Western Conference

Overall table 
Note: the table below has no impact on playoff qualification and is used solely for determining host of the MLS Cup, certain CCL spots, the Supporters' Shield trophy, seeding in the 2014 Canadian Championship, and 2014 MLS draft. The conference tables are the sole determinant for teams qualifying for the playoffs.

Tie-breaking 
The teams are awarded three points for a win, one point for a tie (draw) and zero points for a loss. If teams have an equal number of points the following tie-breaking procedures apply:
 Most wins
 Goals for (GF)
 Goal differential (GD)
 Fewest disciplinary points (foul - one point, first yellow card - three points, second yellow card (resulting in red card) - five points, straight red card - six points, disciplinary committee suspension - six points)
 Road goals
 Road goal differential
 Home goals
 Home goal differential
 Coin toss (two teams) or drawing of lots (three or more)

Playoff bracket

Statistical leaders
Full article: MLS Golden Boot

Top scorers

Source:

Top assists

Source:

|}

Top goalkeepers
(Minimum 1,500 minutes played)

Source:

Individual awards

Monthly awards

Weekly awards

Scoring
First goal of the season: Sébastien Le Toux for Philadelphia Union against Sporting Kansas City, 17 minutes (March 2, 2013)
Hat-tricks of the season:
Mike Magee for Los Angeles Galaxy against Chicago Fire (March 3, 2013)
Marco Di Vaio for Montreal Impact against Philadelphia Union (May 25, 2013)
Robbie Keane for Los Angeles Galaxy against Seattle Sounders FC (May 26, 2013)
Álvaro Saborío for Real Salt Lake against New York Red Bulls (July 27, 2013)
Landon Donovan for Los Angeles Galaxy against FC Dallas (August 11, 2013)
Robbie Keane for Los Angeles Galaxy against Real Salt Lake (August 17, 2013)
Kekuta Manneh for Vancouver Whitecaps FC against Seattle Sounders FC (October 9, 2013)
Camilo for Vancouver Whitecaps FC against Colorado Rapids (October 27, 2013)

Discipline
First yellow card of the season: Aurélien Collin for Sporting Kansas City against Philadelphia Union, 25 minutes (March 2, 2013)
First red card of the season: Joaquín Velázquez for Chivas USA against Los Angeles Galaxy, 40 minutes (March 17, 2013)

End of Season Awards

MLS Best XI

Average attendance
Source:

Coaches

Eastern Conference
Chicago Fire: Frank Klopas
Columbus Crew: Robert Warzycha
D.C. United: Ben Olsen
Houston Dynamo: Dominic Kinnear
Montreal Impact: Marco Schällibaum
New England Revolution: Jay Heaps
New York Red Bulls: Mike Petke
Philadelphia Union: John Hackworth
Sporting Kansas City: Peter Vermes
Toronto FC: Ryan Nelsen

Western Conference
Chivas USA: José Luis Real
Colorado Rapids: Óscar Pareja
FC Dallas: Schellas Hyndman
Los Angeles Galaxy: Bruce Arena
Portland Timbers: Caleb Porter
Real Salt Lake: Jason Kreis
San Jose Earthquakes: Mark Watson
Seattle Sounders FC: Sigi Schmid
Vancouver Whitecaps FC: Martin Rennie

Notes

References

External links
 

 
2013
1